Class 77 may refer to:

British Rail Class 77
Class 77, a designation for EMD Class 66 operated by Euro Cargo Rail in France
 DRG Class 77, a German tank locomotive class with wheel arrangements 2-6-4T or 4-6-2T operated by the Deutsche Reichsbahn and comprising:
 Class 77.0: Palatine P 5
 Class 77.1: Palatine Pt 3/6 and Bavarian Pt 3/6
 Class 77.2: BBÖ 629, PKP Class Okm11
 Class 77.3: ČSD Class 354.1
SNCB Class 77, a Belgian diesel locomotive